Garlenda is a comune (municipality) in the Province of Savona in the Italian region Liguria, located about  southwest of Genoa and about  southwest of Savona.
 
It bordered to the north by the municipality of Villanova d'Albenga, on the south by Stellanello Andora and, to the west with Casanova Lerrone and east Villanova d'Albenga .

References

Cities and towns in Liguria